S.P.O.R.T.S. (stylized as S•P•O•R•T•S) is the eleventh studio album by Japanese Jazz fusion band T-Square, who was then known as The Square. It was released on March 5, 1986. This album is the first appearance of one of their most popular songs, Takarajima (Treasure Island), composed by Hirotaka Izumi, and is also the first studio appearance of first long-term drummer, Hiroyuki Noritake. Bassist Toyoyuki Tanaka later left the band after this album's tour, and would be replaced by Mitsuru Sutoh starting from the next album  Truth.

Track listing
Sources

References

T-Square (band) albums
1986 albums